Ayrılıq (Azerbaijani: ayrılıq/ persian: آیریلیق.           / Ayrılıq, meaning "Separation") is an Azerbaijani folk song with lyrics by Farhad Ebrahimi and music composed by Ali Salimi in 1957. The song is about separation and love and is one of "the most familiar to Azerbaijanis throughout the world". For Iranian Azerbaijanis, loss of the Caucasus to the Russian Empire, and the "Iron Curtain" of the Cold War period that isolated the Soviet Union from the international community was especially painful as it separated Azerbaijani families and relatives from even seeing and communicating with each other. It refers to treaty of Turkmenchay and treaty of Golestan which resulted in the separation of Azerbaijan Republic from Iranian Azerbaijan.

Context
Composer and tar player Ali Salimi's family suffered the harsh policies of Soviet dictator Joseph Stalin and fled Soviet Azerbaijan for Ardabil in Iranian Azerbaijan to the south.  He had been searching for lyrics on which to base a composition to express the motif of "separation", i.e. the "separation from family members, relatives and loved ones-separation from home town and home villages over on the other side of the Araz River".  For Salimi, this was "a painful part of the lives of so many Azerbaijanis" because "neither, the Soviet regime nor Shah's regime allowed us to visit the other side. Going back was only a dream or, at best, a one-way ticket."  He was given a poem by Farhad Ibrahimi and wrote a melody to accompany it.

Versions
Ayrılıq was first recorded by Ali Salimi's wife Fatma Qennadi (under her artist name Vartush) for Tehran radio, where they used to work. Later the famous singer of Soviet Republic of Azerbaijan, Rashid Behbudov, visited Tehran in 1963, where he learned about the song. Reshid began performing the song himself in the Soviet Azerbaijan which made the song popular there. In later years the song was repeatedly performed by other singers including Iranian singer Googoosh, Turkish singer Barış Manço and Selda Bagcan and many others.  More recently, Iranian-American singer Mansour released a contemporary-styled version of the song mixed with "Küçələrə Su Səpmişəm", another Rashid Behbudov favourite.

Lyrics

References

External links
"Ayrılıq" sung by Rashid Behbudov in a traditional style
"Ayrılıq" sung by Googoosh
"Ayrılıq" sung by Deniz Tekin
"Ayrılıq" sung by Mansour in a contemporary mix with "Küçələrə Su Səpmişəm"

Azerbaijani folk songs
Azerbaijani music